Pseudopostega dorsalis is a moth of the family Opostegidae. It was described by Donald R. Davis and Jonas R. Stonis, 2007. It is known from Costa Rica.

The length of the forewings for ssp. dorsalis is 2.2–3.3 mm. Adults have been recorded throughout much of the year, with records known for March to April, June to July and October to November. The length of the forewings for ssp. fasciata is 2.4–2.9 mm. Adults of this subspecies have been collected from May to July and September to November.

Etymology
The species name is derived from the Latin dorsualis (meaning of the back, dorsal) in reference to the large, dark brown to fuscous spot present along the dorsal margin of the forewing. The subspecies name fasciata is derived from the Latin fasciatus (meaning banded) in reference to the prominent, dark brown band extending obliquely across the forewing.

Subspecies
Pseudopostega dorsalis dorsalis (Costa Rica)
Pseudopostega dorsalis fasciata (Costa Rica)

References

Opostegidae
Moths described in 2007